John Young House, also known as the Young-Carter House, is a historic home located in  Warren Township, Clinton County, Indiana.  It was built about 1860, and is a two-story, Greek Revival style brick dwelling with Italianate style detailing.  It has a gabled temple form front facade and an attached kitchen wing.  The front portico was reconstructed in 1992–1993.

It was listed on the National Register of Historic Places in 1994.

References

Houses on the National Register of Historic Places in Indiana
Italianate architecture in Indiana
Greek Revival houses in Indiana
Houses completed in 1860
Buildings and structures in Clinton County, Indiana
National Register of Historic Places in Clinton County, Indiana